"Letting the Cables Sleep" is the second single from British band Bush's third studio album The Science of Things, which was released in 1999. In an interview, Gavin Rossdale revealed that the song was written for a friend who had contracted HIV.

The song became a minor hit, and pushed the album to platinum status. The song was a bigger hit than its predecessor "Warm Machine", but not nearly as successful as the first single from the album, "The Chemicals Between Us." The song was featured in the film Goal II: Living the Dream and in the TV series ER, Charmed and Cold Case.

Track listing
UK CD 1 single 4973352
"Letting the Cables Sleep (single version)" - 4:33
"Letting the Cables Sleep (Nightmares On Wax remix)" - 5:24
"Letting the Cables Sleep (original demo)" - 4:36
UK CD 2 single 4973362 (cardsleeve)
"Letting the Cables Sleep (single version)" - 4:33
"Letting the Cables Sleep (Apocalyptica remix)" - 3:57
"Mouth (The Stingray Mix)" - 5:59
EUR CD single ???
"Letting the Cables Sleep [Nightmares On Wax remix]" - 5:24
"Mouth [The Stingray mix]" - 5:59
"Letting the Cables Sleep [single version]" - 4:33
AUS promo remix single BUSHPRO700 (cardsleeve)a
"Letting the Cables Sleep [Nightmares On Wax remix]" - 5:24
German single ('special classic catalogue' CD) 497 237-2
"Letting the Cables Sleep [edit]" - 4:30
"Everything Zen" - 4:38
"Swallowed" - 4:50
"Mouth [The Stingray mix]" - 5:58

Music video
The music video (directed by Joel Schumacher) features Gavin looking for an apartment and finding himself in a room with a woman (played by actress Michele Hicks). She is dressed in black and does not acknowledge him until their hands meet on the wall. After this first touch, they begin to kiss and take off their clothes. This sequence is  interlinked with scenes of them wordlessly putting their clothes back on after sex. She seems troubled by either regret or the desire to tell him something, but she leaves without a word. After this, she is sitting on a chair elsewhere while Gavin begins painting the wall with the lyrics about 'silence' and 'talking', seeming upset and frustrated. Afterwards, Gavin catches up with her on a sidewalk, and she uses sign language to say that she can't hear him. She is then pulled away by a concerned friend who uses sign language to ask her why she did not call.

Charts

References

External links

1999 songs
2000 singles
Bush (British band) songs
British soft rock songs
Rock ballads
Song recordings produced by Clive Langer
Song recordings produced by Alan Winstanley
Songs written by Gavin Rossdale
Interscope Records singles
Trauma Records singles